Aglaocrinus is an extinct species of crinoids in the Cladia order. It has been proposed that it was a blind, stationary (attached) suspension feeder the hard parts of which were composed of magnesium calcite. It has been discovered in 3 locations in North America.

Species
There are currently 12 species in this genus, consisting of:

Aglaocrinus cranei (Strimple, 1971); also known as Aaglaocrinus cranei
Aglaocrinus expansus
Aglaocrinus keytei (Strimple & Moore 1973); also known as Aaglaocrinus keytai
Aglaocrinus konecnyorum (Webster 1981)
Aglaocrinus magnus (Strimple 1949)
Aglaocrinus nacoensis (Webster 1981)
Aglaocrinus oklahomensis (Moore & Plummer 1938); also known as Ethelocrinus oklahomensis (Moore & Plummer, 1938)
Aglaocrinus rectilatus (Lane & Webster, 1966)
Aglaocrinus supplantus (Pabian & Strimple 1974); also known as Aaglaocrinus supplantus
Aglaocrinus sutherlandi (Strimple 1980)
Aglaocrinus tuberculatus (Meek & Worthen 1867)
Aglaocrinus verrucosus(White & St John 1868); also known as Hydreionocrinus verrucosus (White & St John 1868)

References

Further reading
Late Desmoinesian crinoid faunule from Oklahoma. Bulletin of the Oklahoma Geological Survey, 93 1961: 1–189.  [Zoological Record Volume 98]

Paleozoic echinoderms of North America
Cladida
Prehistoric crinoid genera
Carboniferous crinoids
Pennsylvanian animals of North America